Carleton H. Sheets (August 25, 1939 - January 25, 2020) was a prominent real estate investor and author who was notable for television infomercials which marketed real estate business learning materials. Sheets appeared on numerous radio and television talk shows. His No Down Payment television program won numerous awards and is credited as being the longest running program of its kind- spanning 25 years.

Sheets was born in Illinois and moved to Delaware, Ohio, where his father worked for Procter & Gamble. One of his early jobs was marketing soft-drink bottle caps and later became director of marketing for a Florida company that was a major processor of orange juice. In the 1970s, he started investing in property, and in the early 1980s he worked as a pitchman for a company that represented a real estate authority, an early advocate of the "no-money-down" path to financial success.

In 1984 Sheets teamed up with businessmen from Chicago, Mark S. Holecek and Donald R. Strumillo, to form their venture "Professional Education Institute." The privately held "Professional Education Institute" is incorporated as AMS Direct, Inc. It was founded in 1983 and is based in Burr Ridge, Illinois with coaching locations and operations in Salt Lake City, Utah. The Better Business Bureau has reported hundreds of complaints from customers of Mr. Sheets and P.E.I., many of them contending that they were overbilled and had difficulties securing refunds. A few state attorney general offices say they have received a handful of similar complaints over the years.

Sheets died January 25, 2020. He was survived by a wife, two children, a stepson and one grandchild.

References 

American marketing people
American investors
American real estate businesspeople
Infomercials
1939 births
2020 deaths